Kyaw Myint Oo (born 12 March 1974) is a Burmese politician who currently serves as  an Amyotha Hluttaw MP for Mandalay Region  No. 10 Constituency. He is a member of National League for Democracy.

Early life and education
He was born on 12 March 1974 in Lewe, Mandalay Region, Burma (Myanmar). He graduated with B.Agr.Sc from Yezin Agricultural University.

Political career
He is a member of the National League for Democracy. In the 2015 Myanmar general election, he was elected as an Amyotha Hluttaw MP and elected representative from Mandalay Region No. 10 parliamentary constituency.

External links

References

National League for Democracy politicians
1974 births
Living people
People from Mandalay Region